Valdecir de Souza Júnior (born April 21, 1987 in Belo Horizonte), or simply Tchô, is a Brazilian attacking midfielder who plays for Palmas.

Honours
Atlético Mineiro
Brazilian Série B: 2006
Minas Gerais State League: 2007

Contract
Atlético Mineiro 2 January 2006 to 2 January 2009.

External links

 
Tchô at Zerozero.pt 

 
 

1987 births
Living people
Footballers from Belo Horizonte
Brazilian footballers
Brazilian expatriate footballers
Campeonato Brasileiro Série A players
Campeonato Brasileiro Série B players
Clube Atlético Mineiro players
C.S. Marítimo players
Clube Atlético Bragantino players
Figueirense FC players
Associação Atlética Ponte Preta players
América Futebol Clube (MG) players
Esporte Clube Bahia players
Esporte Clube Água Santa players
Boa Esporte Clube players
Villa Nova Atlético Clube players
Tupi Football Club players
Botafogo Futebol Clube (SP) players
Bangu Atlético Clube players
Brasiliense Futebol Clube players
Ipatinga Futebol Clube players
Palmas Futebol e Regatas players
Primeira Liga players
Expatriate footballers in Portugal
Brazilian expatriate sportspeople in Portugal
Brazil youth international footballers
Association football forwards